Joseph or Joe Kerwin may refer to:

 Joseph P. Kerwin (born 1932), American physician and NASA astronaut
 Joseph Kerwin (politician) (born 1993), serving in the Pennsylvania House of Representatives